John Marsh (fl. 1414–1421) of Bath, Somerset, was an English politician.

He was a Member (MP) of the Parliament of England for Bath in April 1414, 1419 and May 1421.

References

14th-century births
15th-century deaths
English MPs April 1414
People from Bath, Somerset
English MPs 1419
English MPs May 1421